Mansu Station may refer to:

 Mansu station (Incheon)
 Mansu station (Hwasun)